Werner Kaiser (born 29 August 1949) is a retired German football player. He spent one season in the Fußball-Bundesliga with Borussia Mönchengladbach.

Honours 
 Bundesliga champion: 1969–70

References

External links 
 

1949 births
Living people
German footballers
Association football forwards
Bundesliga players
Borussia Mönchengladbach players
1. FC Saarbrücken players
20th-century German people